Van Buren is the second-largest city in the Fort Smith, Arkansas–Oklahoma Metropolitan Statistical Area and the county seat of Crawford County, Arkansas, United States. The city is located directly northeast of Fort Smith at the Interstate 40 – Interstate 540 junction. The city was incorporated in 1845 and as of the 2010 census had a population of 22,791, ranking it as the state's 22nd-largest city, behind Searcy.

History

Early history
The area was settled by David Boyd and Thomas Martin in 1818. After Arkansas became a territory in 1819, Daniel and Thomas Phillips constructed a lumber yard in the community to serve as a fuel depot for traffic along the Arkansas River. In 1831, a post office was constructed for the community, at the time known as Phillips Landing. This post office was named after newly appointed Secretary of State and future President Martin Van Buren.

John Drennen, along with his partner David Thompson, purchased the area for US$11,000. They moved their business of supplying firewood for steamboats to this new location on higher ground. The courthouse was constructed on a lot of land donated by Drennen on the condition that Van Buren become the county seat. The Drennen Reserve is one of the town's existing historical sites from the 1830s.

Van Buren was incorporated on January 4, 1845.

American Civil War

On December 28, 1862, Union and Confederate forces clashed in and around Van Buren, resulting in a defeat for the Confederates, led by Major General T. C. Hindman, driving them south across the river with minimal casualties. Federal forces captured 100 prisoners, as stated in an official report by Major General Samuel R. Curtis.

2019 flood

The river approached  and destroyed or damaged low-lying areas. All of the levees that were reinforced from the 1943-45 flood held in place, except for one spot along highway 59 south, which were reinforced during this flood that saved many farm lands in this low-lying area. This flood would have destroyed a lot of land, homes and businesses if the levees had not been reconstructed after the earlier 1940s flood.

1996 tornado

On April 21, 1996, at 11:12 p.m., an F3 tornado hit the Fort Smith/Van Buren area causing extensive damage. The tornado, which spawned in Oklahoma and crossed into west Fort Smith near the confluence of the Arkansas and Poteau rivers, killed two, injured 89 and caused $300 million in damage. The fatalities were small children from Fort Smith. At its worst, the tornado was one half mile across. After leaving the downtown area of Fort Smith, it traveled northeast through industrial and residential sections of north Fort Smith, then crossed the Arkansas River again into the Mount Vista area on the west side of Van Buren and damaged a highly residential area where no fatalities occurred, although this area was very populated at the time. In total, there were around 1,800 homes damaged, the majority of which were in Van Buren.

Physical geography
Van Buren is located in the southwest corner of Crawford County at  (35.444339, -94.346737). The Arkansas River forms the southern boundary of the city, separating it from Fort Smith of Sebastian County. Lee Creek flows through the western side of the city into the Arkansas River.

Climate
Van Buren lies within a humid subtropical climate area. The city also lies on the eastern edge of the region known as Tornado Alley.  Average temperatures range from 36°F in January, to as high an average of 81 °F in July with temperatures reaching the high 90s and low 100s in August.  The average annual temperature is approximately 60 °F.  Average precipitation is about 41 total inches, with only six inches being snow.

Temperatures above  are not uncommon, occurring on average eleven times a year. Highs below  occur on average five times a year, with 0.2 nights per year dropping below .

Demographics

2020 census

As of the 2020 United States census, there were 23,218 people, 8,990 households, and 6,011 families residing in the city.

2000 census
As of the census of 2000, there were 18,986 people, 6,947 households, and 5,182 families residing in the city. The racial makeup of the city was 87.37% White, 1.64% Black or African American, 1.96% Native American, 2.82% Asian, 3.17% from other races, and 3.03% from two or more races.  6.04% of the population were Hispanic or Latino of any race.

There were 6,947 households, of which 40.4% had children under the age of 18 living with them, 56.2% were married couples living together, 14.7% had a female householder with no husband present, and 25.4% were classified as non-families by the United States Census Bureau.
Of 6,947 households, 362 were unmarried partner households: 304 heterosexual, 12 same-sex male, and 46 same-sex female households. 21.7% of all households were made up of individuals, and 8.2% had someone living alone who was 65 years of age or older.  The average household size was 2.67 and the average family size was 3.12.

In the city, the population was spread out, with 29.6% under the age of 18, 9.0% from 18 to 24, 30.7% from 25 to 44, 20.1% from 45 to 64, and 10.6% who were 65 years of age or older.  The median age was 33 years. For every 100 females, there were 92.0 males.  For every 100 females age 18 and over, there were 86.8 males.

The median income for a household in the city was $33,608, and the median income for a family was $37,198. Males had a median income of $28,798 versus $21,201 for females. The per capita income for the city was $14,948.  About 13.5% of families and 16.7% of the population were below the poverty line, including 24.4% of those under age 18 and 13.0% of those age 65 or over.

Economy and infrastructure 

Van Buren is home to many large corporations within the state and employs a great deal of the city's population within its Port and Industrial Park district. Manufacturing, food processing, and medicine are sustaining industries in Van Buren. Major employers include poultry processors Tyson Foods and Simmons, the Van Buren School District, USA Truck, and Baptist Health.

Culture

Arts and architecture

Van Buren is home of the King Opera House, a Victorian-style performance hall from the late 19th century, part of the old downtown historic area.  At the south end of the historical downtown is the Crawford County courthouse, the oldest functioning courthouse west of the Mississippi River.  To the north is the Old Frisco Station which was originally a station on the St. Louis-San Francisco Railway, pictured at the top of this page.

Media
As part of the primary Fort Smith metropolitan area, many Fort Smith based television stations including KHBS and KFSM, whose radio mast is built in Van Buren, provide local news and weather.
The city's major newspaper is the Van Buren Press Argus-Courier; however many people also read Fort Smith's Southwest Times Record, as well as the Northwest Edition of the Arkansas Democrat-Gazette.

Transportation
Van Buren's location at the junction of Interstate 40, Interstate 540, and the Arkansas/Oklahoma border yields surprisingly large tourism and hospitality industries. The city is also located at the junction of several state and U.S. highways including Arkansas Highway 59, US 64, and US 71. A private airport, Twin Cities Airport (code 39AR), was operational to the southeast of the city, but has been closed for many years.  Modern railroads in the city include the Arkansas and Missouri Railroad and the Union Pacific Railroad.

Education
The Van Buren School District is the largest school district in Crawford County, consisting of six elementary schools (grades K-5), two middle schools (grades 6–8), one ninth grade academy (grade 9) and one high school (grades 10–12).  The Van Buren High School is in the 5A/6A-West Division of Arkansas high school sports.

Sites of interest

Historic Main Street, used for scenes in the film The Blue and the Gray as well as scenes in the film Frank & Jesse
King Opera House, performance hall and historic landmark
The Old Frisco Station-Victorian style railroad station; used for a scene in the film Biloxi Blues.  It was part of the now defunct St. Louis–San Francisco Railway also known as the Frisco.

Notable people
 Cyrus Adler, Jewish religious leader and scholar
 Bob Burns, comedian and actor
 Charlene Fite, Republican member of the Arkansas House of Representatives from Van Buren; educator in Fort Smith
 Gary Deffenbaugh, Republican member of the Arkansas House of Representatives from Van Buren; retired educator
 Matt Jones, NFL player
 John Deweese, U.S. representative from North Carolina
 Shay Mooney, singer songwriter from duo Dan + Shay
 Natalie White, winner of Survivor: Samoa

See also

Battle of Van Buren
List of cities and towns in Arkansas
National Register of Historic Places listings in Crawford County, Arkansas

References

Further reading

External links

 Government

Van Buren Advertising & Promotions Commission
 General information
The Press Argus-Courier
The Southwest Times Record

 
1845 establishments in Arkansas
Cities in Arkansas
Cities in Crawford County, Arkansas
County seats in Arkansas
Fort Smith metropolitan area
Populated places established in 1845
Arkansas populated places on the Arkansas River